The 1985 East Carolina Pirates football team was an American football team that represented East Carolina University as an independent during the 1985 NCAA Division I-A football season. In their first season under head coach Art Baker, the team compiled a 2–9 record.

Schedule

References

East Carolina
East Carolina Pirates football seasons
East Carolina Pirates football